The Final Verdict is a syndicated radio program heard on radio stations throughout the United States. The daily program is presented by renowned attorney J. Coleman and covers legal topics such as divorce, real estate, working conditions, accidents, religion, marriage, and money. Every episode of The Final Verdict is based on a genuine legal case and the results are an actual judge's final ruling.

External links
Previously aired programs

American radio programs